A sari-sari store, anglicized as neighborhood sundry store, is a convenience store found in the Philippines. The word sari-sari is Tagalog meaning "variety" or "sundry". Such stores occupy an important economic and social location in a Filipino community and are ubiquitous in neighborhoods and along streets. Sari-sari stores tend to be family-run and privately owned operating within the shopkeeper's residence. Commodities are displayed in a large screen-covered or metal-barred window in front of the shop. Candies in recycled jars, canned goods and cigarettes are displayed while cooking oil, salt and sugar are stored at the back of the shop. Prepaid mobile phone credits are provided. The sari-sari store operates with a small revolving fund, and it generally does not offer perishable goods requiring refrigeration. The few that do have refrigerators carry soft drinks, beers, and bottled water.

Economic value

Sari-sari stores are an integral part of the ecosystem of society and contribute to the grassroots micro-economy. According to the Magna Kultura Foundation, the network of sari-sari stores nationwide accounts for almost seventy per cent (70%) of sales of manufactured consumer food products, which makes it a valuable part of the economy and an important conduit for making vital goods available to Filipino neighborhoods. Sari-sari store are the backbone of the grassroots economy. An estimated 800,000 sari-sari stores hold significant portion of the domestic retail market and the country’s GDP. 13 percent or Php 1.3 trillion of the Philippines GDP of Php 9.7 trillion in the year 2011 came from retail, which is composed largely of micro, small, and medium-sized enterprises (MSMEs) or small businesses like sari-sari stores. 

Often sari-sari store owners apply a markup of about 10% on average, compared to the 20% average markup of the 24/7 convenience store alternatives such as 7-11, so most Filipinos tend to buy at sari-sari stores when possible. Sari-sari stores have higher prices when compared to supermarkets but provides several benefits to their customers. The sari-sari store provides easy access to basic commodities at low cost. Without them, villagers must go to the nearest market town, which may be quite far from the village itself. In the Philippines, following the concept of tingi or retail, a customer can buy 'units' of the product rather than whole package. For example, one can buy a single cigarette for (5) five pesos (0.10 US dollars) rather than a whole pack. This is convenient for those who cannot buy the whole package or do not need much of it, although it is cumulatively more expensive. The sari-sari store also saves the customer from paying extra transportation costs, especially in rural areas, since some towns can be very far from the nearest market or grocery. The store may also allow purchases on credit. The stores also act as trading centers in rural areas. Farmers and fishermen may directly trade their products to the sari-sari store in return for basic articles, fuel, and other supplies.

The owners can buy grocery commodities in bulk, then sell them in-store at a mark-up. Trucks deliver LPG and soft drinks directly to the store. The store requires little investment since the products are cheap and only a few modifications on one side of a house are needed to convert it to a sari-sari store. The sari-sari store also allows credit purchases from its "suki" (repeat customers known to the store owners). They usually keep a record of their customers' outstanding balances on a school notebook and demand payments on paydays.

The lifespan of sari-sari stores is highly variable, with many closing after a few weeks due to insufficient income or management mishandling by owners who have limited formal schooling.

Social value 

The Magna Kultura Foundation notes that the sari-sari store is part of Philippine culture, and it has become an integral part of every Filipino’s life. It is a constant feature of residential neighborhoods in the Philippines, both in rural and urban areas, proliferating even in the poorest communities. About ninety-three percent (93%) of all sari-sari stores nationwide are located in residential communities. The neighborhood sari-sari store (variety or general) is part and parcel of daily life for the average Filipino. Any essential household good that might be missing from one’s pantry – from basic food items like sugar, coffee, and cooking condiments, to other necessities like soap or shampoo, is most conveniently purchased from the nearby sari-sari store at economically sized quantities that are affordable to common citizens. The sari-sari store offers a place where people can meet. The benches provided in front of the store are usually occupied by local people; some men spend time drinking there while women discuss the latest local news, youths also use the place to hang out and children also rest there in the afternoons after playing and buy soft drinks and snacks.

In popular culture

Pinoy rock band Eraserheads' song "Tindahan ni Aling Nena" ("Aling Nena's Store"; from the album UltraElectroMagneticPop!) tells the story of a man buying food at a sari-sari store and his attempts to court the eponymous store owner's daughter. It is described as a song about the love between young people with limited economic means.

See also
 Toko
 Warung
 Bodega
 Kopi tiam
 Mamak stall

References

External links

Sari-sari

Philippine culture
Tagalog words and phrases
Convenience stores of the Philippines
Architecture in the Philippines
Retailing in the Philippines